The 2014 AAA Texas 500 was a NASCAR Sprint Cup Series stock car race held on November 2, 2014, at Texas Motor Speedway in Fort Worth, Texas. Contested over 341 laps, it was the 34th race of the 2014 NASCAR Sprint Cup Series season and eighth race of the Chase for the Sprint Cup. Jimmie Johnson won the race, his fourth win of the season and third straight win in the fall Texas race, while Kevin Harvick finished second. Brad Keselowski, Kyle Busch, and Jamie McMurray rounded out the top five. The top rookies of the race were Kyle Larson (7th), Justin Allgaier (20th), and Austin Dillon (21st).

Previous week's race
Dale Earnhardt Jr. took the lead from Tony Stewart with four laps to go and held off a hard charging Jeff Gordon to score his first career win at Martinsville Speedway. “Oh, man, been trying to win here for so many years,” Earnhardt said. “Real emotional win. I can't believe we won here. We’re going to drink a lot of beer tonight. It's a real emotional win. This team on pit road was great and Steve (Letarte, crew chief) and the guys did a real good job all day. They gave me a great shot at it there with the call at the end to take tires. I can't believe we won here. This means so much to all of us. It's just real emotional.” "That means so much to Hendrick Motorsports," Gordon said. "That's the best way you can possibly pay tribute to those that we lost 10 years ago. To have a 1-2 finish, that's pretty awesome. I would have loved to have gotten that win to move on to Homestead, but this is certainly a great start for us." "I thought we had the car to beat," Gordon said. "Those last couple of laps were just wild. This means so much to Hendrick Motorsports. It's the best way to pay tribute to everyone we lost 10 years ago. I would have loved to get that win to move on to Homestead. But I'm real happy for Dale. I know this means so much to him."

Report

Background
Texas Motor Speedway is a speedway located in the northernmost portion of the U.S. city of Fort Worth, Texas – the portion located in Denton County, Texas. The track measures 1.5 miles (2.4 km) around and is banked 24 degrees in the turns, and is of the oval design, where the front straightaway juts outward slightly. With the ability to seat over 190,000, Texas Motor Speedway has the largest capacity for any NASCAR track after Indianapolis Motor Speedway. The track layout is similar to Atlanta Motor Speedway and Charlotte Motor Speedway (formerly Lowe's Motor Speedway). The track is owned by Speedway Motorsports, Inc., the same company that owns Atlanta and Charlotte Motor Speedways, as well as the short-track Bristol Motor Speedway.

Practice and qualifying
It was cold outside and you get a lot of grip. We haven't qualified that good this year most of the year. All three of those laps were all I could get.” “We hit it the second round, and I missed it in the third round, my fault,’’ Tony Stewart said. “To be the first to run 200 mph average on a 1.5-mile is pretty cool.” "It was three incredible laps and a great effort by our Drive to End Hunger Chevrolet team today," Jeff Gordon said. "All day long we have had a fast race car. It's awesome to be able to be able to back that up in qualifying."

Race
Prior to the start of the race, Danica Patrick changed transmission and started last.

The race was scheduled to begin at 3:16 PM Eastern time, but started at 3:20 p.m. with Matt Kenseth leading the field to the green.
During the first 30 laps of the race, Kenseth moved past Jimmie Johnson to become the all-time laps leader at Texas Motor Speedway. Danica Patrick made an unscheduled stop on lap 37 for a flat tire. The first caution of the race flew on lap 42 after Josh Wise got loose, overcorrected and hit the wall in turn 2. The race restarted on lap 47. Kenseth led the first 53 laps, but Jimmie Johnson took the lead from him on lap 54. Johnson gave up the lead on lap 92 to pit and Kevin Harvick assumed the lead. Harvick ducked onto pit road on lap 93 and the lead cycled back to Johnson. Johnson pitted on lap 138 and Jeff Gordon assumed the lead. Gordon hit pit road on lap 139 and gave the lead back to Johnson. Debris in turn 2 brought out the second caution on lap 175. Johnson and Gordon swapped the lead on pit road with Johnson pitting before the start/finish line, but he beat Gordon off pit road. The race restarted on lap 183. Earlier in the race, Matt Kenseth became the all-time laps leader at Texas. Jimmie Johnson took back that title at somewhere between lap 183 and lap 200. Kyle Busch, who had won both Truck and Nationwide Series races and was looking to sweep the weekend, hit the wall and lost a tire on lap 205 to bring out the third caution of the race. Just as during the previous pit cycle, Gordon and Johnson swapped the lead on pit road before Johnson wins the race off. The race restarted on lap 211. Jeff Gordon took the lead from Johnson on lap 217. Caution flew for the fourth time on lap 223 for a Ford grill plate that came off the front of Carl Edwards's car. Denny Hamlin took two tires when the leaders took four to take the lead. The race restarted on lap 228 and Hamlin promptly lost the lead to Jeff Gordon. Debris in turn 4 brought out the fifth caution on lap 241. Jimmie Johnson beat Jeff Gordon off pit road to take back the lead. The race restarted on lap 247. Debris from the No. 10 car of Danica Patrick brought out the sixth caution of the race on lap 252. Brad Keselowski stayed out when the leaders pitted to take the lead. The race restarted on lap 259. Jeff Gordon and Brad Keselowski swapped the lead with 69 and 68 to go. Gordon was finally able to get by Keselowksi with 59 laps to go.
The seventh caution of the race came out with 50 laps to go when A. J. Allmendinger lost the car in turn 3. Jimmie Johnson took back the lead off pit road. The race restarted with 44 laps to go. Caution flew for the eighth time with 39 laps to go for a trail of debris left by Brett Moffitt. Matt Kenseth stayed out when the leaders pitted and assumed the lead. The race restarted with 32 laps to go. Kurt Busch took the lead and caution flew for the ninth time with 31 laps to go. Joey Logano cut the right-front tire and spun out in turn 2. The race restarted with 26 laps to go. Caution flew for the tenth time with 21 laps to go after Kasey Kahne got loose exiting turn 4, made contact with Marcos Ambrose and went through the grass on the front stretch. The race restarted with 17 laps to go. Jimmie Johnson took back the lead. The eleventh caution of the race flew with 15 laps to go after Trevor Bayne hooked Kasey Kahne and sent him into the backstretch wall. The race restarted with nine laps to go. Jeff Gordon took the lead. Caution flew for the twelfth time with four laps to go after Clint Bowyer got loose, overcorrected and slammed the fall on the front stretch. Gordon lost the lead on the first attempt, made contact with Brad Keselowski, spun out and brought out the 13th caution of the race. Jimmie Johnson held off Keselowski and Harvick to score his 70th career win. “It's a testament to this team and the fact that we'll never give up,” said Johnson. “We'll always keep fighting and keep trying to make our cars better. We’re not in the Chase and not where we want to be - fighting for the championship.”

Post-race
There was a brawl on pit road involving Jeff Gordon and Brad Keselowski and Kevin Harvick. Keselowski and Harvick were parked in the post-race impound area where the cars that finished second through sixth are held for post-race inspection. Gordon pulled his car and parked it right beside Keselowski's car. He got out and had a level-headed conversation with the driver of the No. 2 Ford that seemed to make him more angry. As Keselowski was putting on his Miller Lite cap, Kevin proceeded to shove him towards Gordon and the brawl began when Gordon grabbed Keselowski's firesuit. Multiple pit crews from the three racing stables as well as Paul Menard's, Danica Patrick's and Kasey Kahne's crew were involved (Keselowski's spot in the impound area was in the pit stall of the No. 27 car). ESPN's Jamie Little was caught in the middle of it. “We’re racing for the win,” said Keselowski of the on track contact as the crowd booed loudly during the interview. “[Wasn't trying] to wreck him, just racing hard. He left a hole and you know, everything you watch in racing, you leave a hole, you’re supposed to go for it. It closed back up and we made contact. I don't want to ruin anyone’s day. I want to win the race and that was our opportunity. Just didn't come together.” “I spun the tires a little bit but I got a pretty decent start and we went down into one and I just wanted to get to the outside of the 48 [Johnson] and out of nowhere, I got slammed by the 2 and it cut my left rear tire. He's just a dipshit," Gordon said in a nationally televised interview on ESPN. "I don't know how he's ever won a championship. I'm just sick and tired of him. ... That was a huge race for us. I'm proud of Jimmie Johnson for winning that race. I didn't want that you-know-what (Keselowski) to win that race. ... (Keselowski) gets himself in this position himself and as far as I'm concerned he's got to pay the consequences. ... It's total crap. The kid is just doing stuff way over his head." “I'm not trying to sit here and sugarcoat it and try to be The Intimidator,’’ Keselowski said. “That's not what I'm trying to say. My expectation is if there's a gap, they'll go for it. If there's a gap, I'll go for it. If it closes up, there's contact, then that's racing. And that's what happened today. Will those guys race me hard or harder than others? Absolutely, I'm certain they will. But that's just part of it. I can't fault them for that. I just feel like I have to go for the gap if it's there, and I have to race the way I race or I won't even be in NASCAR.  I'd rather have enemies in NASCAR than have friends and be sitting at home.’’ “If you’re going to drive like that, you better be willing to fight,’’ Harvick said he told Keselowski. “He was going to stand behind his guys. Jeff Gordon deserved to at least have a face-to-face conversation with him. I wasn’t standing up for anybody. (Keselowski) just ran over (Gordon). He was standing back behind all his guys, not wanting to defend what he did. I said, ‘You’re the problem, get in your own fight.’ ‘’ Robin Pemberton, NASCAR's senior vice president of competition, said that series officials will review what took place to determine what, if any, penalties will be issued. “Holding onto each other and grabbing… that's one thing. When punches are landed, it's a different scenario," Pemberton said.

Penalties
On Tuesday, November 4, the following penalties were handed down by NASCAR regarding the post-race brawl.

Jeremy Fuller, rear tire changer with the No. 5 team along with Dwayne Doucette and Jason Ingle, mechanics with the No. 24 team, each have been fined $25,000 and suspended from NASCAR through the completion of the next six NASCAR Sprint Cup Series championship points races (They'll be eligible to return for the March 22, Auto Club 400 at Auto Club Speedway). All three were found to be in violation of:

• Section 12-1: Actions detrimental to stock car racing

• Section 12-4.9: Behavioral penalty – involved in a post-race physical altercation with a driver on pit road

Dean Mozingo, mechanic with the No. 24 team and the team's hauler driver, has been fined $10,000 and suspended from NASCAR through the completion of the next three NASCAR Sprint Cup Series championship points races. He was found to be in violation of:

• Section 12-1: Actions detrimental to stock car racing

• Section 12-4.9: Behavioral penalty – involved in a post-race physical altercation with another crew member on pit road

Kenny Francis, crew chief of the No. 5 team, and Alan Gustafson, crew chief of the No. 24 team, have each been fined $50,000 and placed on NASCAR probation through the completion of the next six NASCAR Sprint Cup Series championship points races. They were found to be in violation of:

• Section 9-4A: Crew chief assumes responsibility for the actions of his team members

• Section 12-1: Actions detrimental to stock car racing

• Section 12-4.9: Behavioral penalty

"While the intensity and emotions are high as we continue through the final rounds of the Chase for the NASCAR Sprint Cup, the actions that we saw from several crew members Sunday following the race at Texas are unacceptable," said Robin Pemberton, NASCAR senior vice president/competition and racing development. "We reviewed the content that was available to us of the post-race incident along pit road, and identified several crew members who crossed the line with their actions, specifically punching others."

"We therefore have penalized four crew members as well as their crew chiefs, as they ultimately are responsible for members of their team per the NASCAR rulebook," Pemberton continued. "A NASCAR championship is at stake, but we can't allow behavior that crosses the line to go unchecked, particularly when it puts others in harm's way."

Results

Qualifying

Race results

Race statistics
 23 lead changes among different drivers
 13 cautions for 61 laps
 Time of race: 3:52:05
 Jimmie Johnson won his fourth race in 2014

Standings after the race

Drivers' Championship standings

Manufacturers' Championship standings

Note: Only the first sixteen positions are included for the driver standings.

Note

References

AAA Texas 500
AAA Texas 500
AAA Texas 500
2010s in Fort Worth, Texas
NASCAR races at Texas Motor Speedway